Kyle Murphy (born October 5, 1991) is an American professional racing cyclist, who currently rides for UCI ProTeam .

Career
Murphy was third in the King of the Mountains competition and rode in the main breakaways on three stages. He rode in the men's team time trial at the 2015 UCI Road World Championships. In October 2017  announced that Murphy would join them for 2018.

Major results

2014
 10th Tobago Cycling Classic
2017
 6th Overall Joe Martin Stage Race
 10th Overall Tour of the Gila
2018
 3rd Overall Tour of the Gila
2019
 6th Overall Tour of Utah
 6th Overall Tour de Beauce
 10th Overall Tour of Turkey
2020 
 2nd Prueba Villafranca de Ordizia
2021 
 Volta a Portugal
1st Stages 2 & 8
2022
 1st  Road race, National Road Championships
 5th Overall Tour of Antalya

References

External links

1991 births
Living people
American male cyclists
Sportspeople from Palo Alto, California